Kryštofovy Hamry is a municipality and village in Chomutov District in the Ústí nad Labem Region of the Czech Republic. It has about 200 inhabitants.

Administrative parts
The village of Černý Potok, the hamlet of Mezilesí and the area of the former village of Rusová are administrative parts of Kryštofovy Hamry. The former town of Přísečnice was also located in what is today the municipal territory of Kryštofovy Hamry.

Notable people
Richard Markgraf (1869–1916), palaeontologist
Eugen Sänger (1905–1964), Austrian aerospace engineer

References

Villages in Chomutov District